Warren Jacques (born 10 March 1938) is an Australian tennis coach and former player.

Jacques, a native of Sydney, was active on the international tour in the 1960s. He reached the fourth round of the 1961 Wimbledon Championships, beating Jørgen Ulrich, Ingo Buding and Donald Dell en route. His title wins included the Welsh Championships in 1963.

During the 1980s, while working in Dallas, Jacques was the tour coach of Texas-based players Kevin Curren, Steve Denton and Bill Scanlon. He guided both Curren and Scanlon to the world's top 10, while Denton made it as high as 12 under Jacques. In 1987 he was appointed captain of the Great Britain Davis Cup team and stayed in the position for three Davis Cup campaigns.

References

External links
 
 

1938 births
Living people
Australian male tennis players
Australian tennis coaches
Tennis players from Sydney
Australian expatriates in the United States